Renato Netson Benatti (born 17 October 1981), simply known as Renato, is a Brazilian footballer who plays as a central defender.

He spent the most of his career with his native Rio Grande do Sul clubs, and played notably for Chunnam Dragons, Esporte Clube Juventude, UD Almería, Criciúma Esporte Clube and Associação Naval 1º de Maio.

References

External links

1981 births
Living people
Brazilian footballers
Brazilian expatriate footballers
UD Almería players
Associação Naval 1º de Maio players
Jeonnam Dragons players
K League 1 players
Esporte Clube Juventude players
Expatriate footballers in Spain
Expatriate footballers in South Korea
Association football defenders